The 2019 Sudirman Cup (officially known as the  2019 Total BWF Sudirman Cup for sponsorship reasons) was the 16th edition of the Sudirman Cup, the biennial international badminton championship contested by the mixed national teams of the member associations of Badminton World Federation (BWF), since its inception in 1989. The tournament was played in Nanning, China, between 19 and 26 May 2019. Korea is the defending champion.

China defeated Japan 3–0 in the final to win the tournament.

Host city selection
Nanning was the only bidder for this event. The bid was approved by Badminton World Federation on 18 March 2017 during a meeting in Kuala Lumpur. The city itself won the internal bidding phase by the Chinese Badminton Association, being the preferred city over Nanjing (later chosen to host 2018 BWF World Championships), Qingdao, and Wuhan.

Seedings
The seedings for 32 teams competing in the tournament were announced on 12 March 2019. It was based on aggregated points from the best players in the world ranking as of 5 March 2019. The tournament was divided into four groups, with twelve teams in the elite group competing for the title. Eight teams were seeded into second and third groups and four remaining teams were seeded into fourth group.

On the day of the draw, it was announced that the original list of 32 teams was pared down to 31, with Kenya withdrawing from the tournament. The 31 participating teams were divided into four groups, with Group 1 consisting of the 12 teams that will compete for the title. Group 2 and Group 3 (eight teams each) along with Group 4 (three teams) will fight for overall placings. The draw was held on 19 March 2019.

Group composition

Tiebreakers
The rankings of teams in each group were determined as follows (regulations Chapter 5 Section 5.1. Article 16.3): 
Points
Results between tied teams
Match difference
Game difference
Point difference

Teams that won 3 match first win the tie: 1 points for the winner, 0 points for the loser.

Squads

Group stage

Group 1A

Group 1B

Group 1C

Group 1D

Group 2A

Group 2B

Group 3A

Group 3B

Group 4

Knockout stage

Classification bracket

Classification round

|-

|-

|-

|-

|-

|-

|-

|-

|}

Final bracket
The draw for the quarterfinals was held after the completion of the final matches in the group stage on 22 May 2019.

Quarterfinals

|-

|-

|-

|-

|}

Semifinals

|-

|-

|}

Final

|}

Final ranking

References

 
2019
Sudirman Cup
Sudirman Cup
Badminton tournaments in China
International sports competitions hosted by China
Sport in Guangxi
Sudirman Cup